Gerard Anthony Daly (born 30 April 1954) is an Irish former footballer who played in the Football League for Manchester United, Derby County, Coventry City, Leicester City, Birmingham City, Shrewsbury Town, Stoke City, Doncaster Rovers as well as the Republic of Ireland national team.

Domestic career
Daly was born in Cabra, Dublin, and started his football career in Drumcondra with Stella Maris. His first senior club was Bohemians, for whom he scored in the UEFA Cup away to Köln in September 1972. In 1973, Manchester United manager Tommy Docherty paid Bohemians £20,000 for Daly's services. In Daly's first season at Old Trafford, the team was relegated to the Second Division after finishing 21st out of 22 teams. Despite this setback, Manchester United gained an instant return to the top flight with Daly being a key player. He continued his good form into the 1975–76 season, playing in 51 matches, including the 1976 FA Cup Final. Midway through the 1976–77 season, Daly was sold to Derby County for a fee of £175,000.

Daly was soon reunited his old manager Docherty, who was appointed manager of the Rams in September 1977. Although they did not get on, Daly remained with Derby until 1980. Daly scored a famous penalty for Derby in 1977 against Manchester City where the penalty spot had to be re-painted during the game, due to the poor condition of the Baseball Ground pitch. During his time with Derby, Daly spent time on loan with the New England Tea Men of the North American Soccer League in 1978 and 1979. Following Derby's relegation in 1980, Daly signed for Coventry City, with whom he spent four seasons, including a spell on loan to Leicester City in 1982.

He then spent a season at Birmingham City before signing for Shrewsbury Town in October 1985. His experience helped them remain in the second tier finishing in 17th position in 1985–86 and 18th in 1986–87. This prompted Stoke City manager Mick Mills to sign Daly in March 1987. In 1987–88 Daly played 30 times for Stoke scoring three goals but fell out of favour in March 1988 and was released at the end of the season. He then moved on to Fourth Division Doncaster Rovers where he spent the 1988–89 season playing in 44 matches. He joined non-league Telford United in 1989 and later managed the club between 1990 and 1993.

International career
Daly represented Ireland from 1973 to 1986, earning 48 caps. He won his first cap in a friendly against Poland. He scored 13 international goals, making him one of the top-scoring Irish midfielders. His first goal in 1976 was a penalty in a 1–1 draw against England at Wembley. He scored another goal against England in the Euro qualifiers in 1978. He also scored against Denmark in the Euro qualifiers of 1980. Another goal came in a 2–1 victory over the Netherlands in a World Cup qualifier in 1980.

Daly's last goal for Ireland was in 1986 in a match against Iceland in the Iceland Triangular Tournament to earn Ireland a 2-1 win, and his last match for Ireland was against Scotland in 1986 at Lansdowne Road in a Euro 1988 qualifying match.

Career statistics

Club
Source:

A.  The "Other" column constitutes appearances and goals in the Anglo-Italian Cup, Full Members Cup and Football League Trophy.

International
Source:

Honours
Manchester United
 Football League Second Division: 1974–75

References

External links
 

1954 births
Bohemian F.C. players
Derby County F.C. players
Doncaster Rovers F.C. players
League of Ireland players
Living people
Manchester United F.C. players
New England Tea Men players
North American Soccer League (1968–1984) players
Association footballers from County Dublin
Republic of Ireland association footballers
Republic of Ireland expatriate association footballers
Republic of Ireland international footballers
Republic of Ireland under-23 international footballers
Republic of Ireland under-21 international footballers
Shrewsbury Town F.C. players
Leicester City F.C. players
Stoke City F.C. players
Coventry City F.C. players
Birmingham City F.C. players
English Football League players
Stella Maris F.C. players
Association football midfielders
Expatriate footballers in England
Expatriate soccer players in the United States
Irish expatriate sportspeople in the United States
FA Cup Final players